Lists of the debut appearances of superhero characters by Marvel Comics.

Debuts

1939–1949

1950s

1960s

1970s

1980s

1990s

2000s

2010s

2020s

Notes

References 

Comic book publication histories
Lists of Marvel Comics characters